Jeffrey Paulus (born October 3, 1969) is a Canadian former semi-professional soccer player and former head coach of FC Edmonton in the Canadian Premier League.

He coached the Northern Alberta Institute of Technology men's soccer team between 2004 and 2012 and was crowned Canadian College Athletic Association National Champions in his penultimate season. Having also worked for the Canadian Soccer Association for five years, Paulus joined FC Edmonton as assistant coach and Academy technical director in 2011. He was appointed as FC Edmonton's head coach in July 2018.

Playing career 
Paulus played hockey and soccer as a child. Turning his sole attention to soccer in his teens, he played for local clubs St. Andrews, Maple Leaf and Woburn. He also played and coached while serving in the military in The Maritimes before moving to Alberta.

Coaching career

Early career 
Paulus joined the Northern Alberta Institute of Technology as head coach of the men's soccer program in August 2004. Paulus and his team were named Canadian College Athletic Association National Champions in October 2011. He left the position in November 2012 after eight seasons with the NAIT Ooks.

In September 2006, Paulus also joined the Canadian Soccer Association to coach national team prospects at the Prairies National Training Centre in Edmonton. He worked with players aged between 14 and 17 for five years until his departure in December 2011.

FC Edmonton 
Upon his departure from the Canadian Soccer Association, Paulus joined North American Soccer League club FC Edmonton on a full-time basis. While acting as assistant coach to Colin Miller, he also worked in the Academy as technical director. When the FC Edmonton senior team ceased operations in 2017, Paulus continued to lead the club's youth section.

On July 4, 2018, Paulus was named as the head coach of FC Edmonton after the club was re-founded to compete in the Canadian Premier League. He was then made the interim general manager of FC Edmonton on November 21, 2019, replacing Jay Ball. The club also announced that he would remain as the head coach for the 2020 Canadian Premier League season. Jeff Paulus stepped down as head coach of FC Edmonton on September 21, 2020.

Personal life 
Paulus was born in Scarborough, Ontario and raised in Toronto, Ontario. He graduated from Dalhousie University in 2002 with a degree in History and Sociology, and earned a Bachelor of Education from Acadia University two years later. In 2017, Paulus graduated from Athabasca University with a master's degree in Business Administration.

He served seven years in the Royal Canadian Navy and did a NATO tour to Poland onboard HMCS Halifax.

Paulus was a supporter of former North American Soccer League club the Toronto Blizzard. As a child, he would be a ball boy for the team at the Exhibition Stadium.

Managerial statistics

Honours

Manager

Northern Alberta Institute of Technology 

 Canadian College Athletic Association National Champions – 2011

References 

Living people
Canadian soccer players
1969 births
FC Edmonton coaches
Association footballers not categorized by position
Soccer players from Toronto
Sportspeople from Scarborough, Toronto
Canadian soccer coaches
Canadian Premier League coaches